Roselle Township is one of eighteen townships in Carroll County, Iowa, USA.  As of the 2000 census, its population was 670.

Geography
According to the USGS, it contains two cemeteries: Holy Angels and Saint Augustine.

References

External links
 US-Counties.com
 City-Data.com

Townships in Carroll County, Iowa
Townships in Iowa